In enzymology, a galactinol-raffinose galactosyltransferase is an enzyme that catalyzes the chemical reaction

alpha-D-galactosyl-(1→3)-1D-myo-inositol + raffinose  myo-inositol + stachyose

Thus, the two substrates of this enzyme are α-D-galactosyl-(1→3)-1D-myo-inositol and raffinose, whereas its two products are myo-inositol and stachyose.

This enzyme participates in galactose metabolism.

Nomenclature 

This enzyme belongs to the family of glycosyltransferases, specifically the hexosyltransferases.  The systematic name of this enzyme class is alpha-D-galactosyl-(1→3)-myo-inositol:raffinose galactosyltransferase. Other names in common use include galactinol-raffinose galactosyltransferase, and stachyose synthetase.

References

 
 
 
 Preiss, J. (Ed.), The Biochemistry of Plants, vol. 3, Academic Press, New York, 1980, p. 221-270.

EC 2.4.1
Enzymes of unknown structure